A by-election to the French National Assembly was held in French Dahomey and French Togoland on 10 February 1946. The by-election was required after the death of incumbent MP Francis Aupiais on 18 December 1945. Aupiais had been elected via the first college in October 1945.

Pierre Bertho of the Popular Republican Movement was the only candidate, and was elected with 644 of the 818 votes cast.

Results

References

Dahomey
1946 0
1946 in French Dahomey
1946 0
1946 in French Togoland
By-elections to the National Assembly (France)
February 1946 events in Africa